Gilles Legardinier (born 1965) is a French novelist. He was the recipient of the 2010 Prix SNCF du polar. He was the third best-selling author in France in 2014.

Early life
Gilles Legardinier was born in 1965. He was abandoned as an infant in front of a chapel in the 6th arrondissement of Paris. He did not pass his Baccalaureate.

Career
Legardinier started his career in the film industry.

Legardinier is the author of several best-selling novels. His 2009 novel, L'exil des anges, received the 2010 Prix SNCF du polar. His 2011 novel, Demain j'arrête !, was a best-seller. By 2014, he was the third best-selling author in France after Guillaume Musso and Marc Levy, having sold 1.9 million books. His work has been translated into 20 languages.

Works

References

External links
Official website

Living people
1965 births
French male novelists
20th-century French novelists
21st-century French novelists
20th-century French male writers
21st-century French male writers
Chevaliers of the Ordre des Arts et des Lettres